Ibrahim Qutb Shah Wali (1518 – 5 June 1580), also known by his Telugu names Malki BhaRama and Ibharama Cakravarti, was the fourth monarch of the kingdom of Golconda in southern India. He was the first of the Qutb Shahi dynasty to use the title "Sultan". He ruled from 1550 to 1580. He lived for seven years in exile at the court of Vijayanagara as an honoured guest of Rama Raya. Ibrahim is known for patronizing Telugu extensively because he was moved by a genuine love for the language.

Biography
Ibrahim was born the son of Quli Qutb Mulk, founder of the Qutb Shahi dynasty of Golconda. His father, an ethnic Turkmen, had emigrated to India with his family as a young man and taken employment in the court of the Bahmani Sultanate in the Deccan. He had risen steadily in the army and, when the Bahamani sultanate had splintered and collapsed, he had carved out a sizable principality for himself by force of army. Ibrahim was one of his younger sons. 
In 1543, after achieving so much and living such an extraordinary life, Quli Qutb Mulk was killed by his own younger son, Jamsheed, while he was offering his prayers one day. The assassin, who was Ibrahim's brother, made every effort to capture or kill or mutilate all his brothers. He managed to capture and blind his eldest brother, crown prince Qutbuddin, but Ibrahim somehow managed to escape. He fled Golconda and took refuge in the court of the powerful Hindu ruler of Vijayanagara. Here he lived in exile as an honored guest of the powerful patriarch of Vijayanagara, Rama Raya. He lived at the Vijayanagara court for seven years (1543–50). When Jamsheed died due to Cancer on 12 January 1550, there was internal chaos within the kingdom. His son Subhan who was only an infant,was placed on the throne by Mustapha Khan.Jagadev Rao,Chief of the Naikwari tried to place Jamsheed's brother Daulat Quli, who instead wanted Ibrahim to be the king, on the throne and this led to his imprisonment in Bala Hisar,The Highest point of the Golkonda fort. Some discontented elements within the kingdom summoned Ibrahim to end his exile and claim the throne for himself.

During his sojourn in Vijayanagara, Ibrahim developed very close and loving ties with the imperial family and among the nobility, and also became deeply influenced by Hindu, Telugu culture. He adopted Hindu/Telugu ways of dress, food, etiquette, and above all, speech. He developed a strong love for the Telugu language, which he patronized and encouraged throughout his reign. Indeed, he even went so far as to adopt a new name for himself, "Malki BhaRama," which is his own name spoken with a strong, rustic Telugu accent. He used this name for himself in various official letters and documents and it therefore gained official recognition. According to a court poet, Ibrahim would sit, "floating on waves of bliss," while listening to the Mahabharata being recited in Telugu rather than Sanskrit. It is said that the court of Ibrahim Qutb Shah had many scholars learned in the Vedas, Sastras and Puranas.

Such favourable attitudes to Hindus had an effect. Ibrahim during his early reign got the support from Telugu noblemen. In 1550 when Ibrahim was returning to Golconda, two envoys were sent to the sultan from the fort of Koilkonda pledging allegiance to him. According to the long inscription at the fort, the Hindus pledged allegiance to him and anyone who 'dealt with any other person other than Ibrahim' would be considered of being of low birth and would incur the sin of having killed cows and Brāhmaṇas at Varanasi

In Vijayanagara, Ibrahim married Bagiradhi (correctly: "Bhagirathi"), a Hindu woman, according to Hindu rites and customs. Bagiradhi was also known as "Kaavya kanyaka" and she came from a family with a legacy in music and dance  rooted in Hindu, south Indian traditions. The son born to Ibrahim and Bhagirathi, Muhammad Quli Qutb Shah, would succeed his father to become the 5th ruler of the dynasty.

Ibrahim employed Hindus for administrative, diplomatic and military purposes within his sultanate. A patron of the arts and of Telugu literature, Ibrahim sponsored many court poets, such as Singanacharyudu, Addanki Gangadharudu, Ponnanganti Telenganaraya and Kandukuru Rudrakavi. There were Telugu poets, in a break from tradition. He also patronized Arabic and Persian poets in his court. He is also known in Telugu literature as Malki Bharama (his adopted Hindu name). Ibrahim repaired and fortified Golconda Fort and developed the Hussain Sagar lake and Ibrahim Bagh. He is described in one of the inscriptions on the "Makki Darwaza" in the fort as "The Greatest of Sovereigns".

In 1565, Ibrahim took the advantage of internal conflicts in Vijayanagara, which had given him shelter in exile during 1543–1550. He became part of a cabal of Muslim rulers of small states which banded together to destroy the powerful Hindu kingdom of Vijayanagara. He thus personally betrayed Rama Raya of Vijayanagara, who had given him shelter during his exile in 1543 to 1550. In the Battle of Talikota which ensued, Rama Raya was killed and the city where Ibrahim had spent seven happy and safe years was razed to the ground; the remnants of its former glory can be seen in the lfixl of Hampi today. Following the battle of Talikota in 1565, Ibrahim was able to expand his own kingdom by taking the important hill forts of Adoni and Udayagiri, which commanded an extensive territory and which had been prized possessions of his former host.

Death
After a short illness, Ibrahim died in 1580. He was succeeded by his son, Muhammad Quli Qutb Shah, who was born of his Hindu wife Bhagirathi.

Family

Wives
Bhagirathi of Vijayanagar
Bibi Jamil; daughter of Sultan Hussain Nizam Shah I of Ahmadnagar

Issue
Muhammad Quli Qutb Shah
Mirza Muhammad Amin (d. 1596); father of Muhammad Qutb Shah
Chand Sultan; married Sultan Ibrahim Adil Shah II of Bijapur

References

External links
 http://www.ioc.u-tokyo.ac.jp/~islamarc/WebPage1/htm_eng/golconda-eng.htm

|-
| width="30%" align="center" | Preceded by:Subhan Quli Qutb Shah
| width="40%" align="center" | Qutb Shahi dynasty1550–1580
| width="30%" align="center" | Succeeded by:Muhammad Quli Qutb Shah
|-

1518 births
1580 deaths
Kings of Golconda
Telugu people
Qutb Shahi dynasty
Indian monarchs